Prior to 1979, Iran's economic development was rapid. Traditionally an agrarian society, by the 1970s the country had undergone significant industrialization and economic modernization. This pace of growth had slowed dramatically by 1978 as capital flight reached $30 to $40 billion 1980 US dollars just before the revolution.

After the Revolution of 1979, Iran's government proceeded with 4 reforms:

 First they nationalized all industry, including the NIOC, and all Iranian banks.
 The new Constitution divided the economy in 3 different sectors, namely "State", "Cooperative" and "Private", with the majority being state-owned businesses.
 The Government started using central planning to control the economy, having the Supreme Leader, the President and Majlis creating 5-year socio-economic plans.
 The State took control of setting prices and subsidies.

The government's long-term objectives since the revolution have been economic independence, full employment, and a comfortable standard of living for citizens, but at the end of the 20th century, the country's economy faced many obstacles. Iran's population more than doubled between 1980 and 2000 and grew increasingly younger. Although a relatively large number of Iranians are farmers, agricultural production has consistently fallen since the 1960s. By the late 1990s, Iran had become a major importer of food. At that time, economic hardship in the countryside resulted in vast numbers of people moving to cities.

The eight-year war with Iraq claimed at least 300,000 Iranian lives and injured more than 500,000. The cost of the war to the country's economy was some $500 billion.  After hostilities with Iraq ceased in 1988, the government tried to develop the country's communication, transportation, manufacturing, health care, education and energy sectors (including its prospective nuclear power facilities), and began the process of integrating its communication and transportation infrastructure with that of neighboring states.

Since 2004, Supreme Leader Khamenei and President Ahmadinejad have tried to implement reforms that will lead to the privatization of Iran but they haven't worked out yet, making Iran a command economy in transition towards a market economy.

Pahlavi Era (1925–79)

Reza Shah Pahlavi (r. 1925–41) improved the country's overall infrastructure, implemented educational reform, campaigned against foreign influence, reformed the legal system, and introduced modern industries. During this time, Iran experienced a period of social change, economic development, and relative political stability.

In the interwar period, modern industries were introduced. Whereas fewer than 20 modern industrial plants existed in 1925, by 1941 more than 800 new plants had been established, with the intention of reducing the country's dependence on imports. The state encouraged industrialization by raising tariffs, financing modern industries, and imposing government monopolies. Changes in the legal system, tax structure, and trade policies attracted domestic financial resources and led to the emergence of a group of new, young entrepreneurs. The shah's court became the biggest investor in the new industries. Primarily by confiscating real estate, the shah himself became the country's richest man. Increased investment in mining, construction, and the manufacturing sector occurred, and infrastructure investment grew significantly. Iran had only 250 kilometers of railroads and 2,400 kilometers of gravel roads in 1925; by 1938 these totals had increased to 1,700 and 12,000 kilometers, respectively. Industrial growth was not balanced, however. Integration among sectors and industries was absent, and the new industries met only part of the growing domestic demand. Agriculture, from which 90 percent of the labor force made its living, did not benefit from economic reform. Furthermore, the expanding areas of the economy were not labor-intensive. Modern sectors (Caspian Sea fisheries, railroads, seaports, the oil industry, modern factories, and coal fields) absorbed a total of only about 170,000 workers, less than 4 percent of the labor force.

The government managed the expansion of international trade by techniques such as the foreign exchange controls imposed in 1936. Many new items were among the imported goods required by industry, the military, railroads, and other areas of infrastructure investment. Traditional agricultural and industrial export products were replaced by oil exports. Germany became Iran's primary trading partner by 1940, accounting for 42 percent of its foreign trade; the United States was second, with 23 percent. The Soviet Union also was a major trading partner in this period. Despite many advances in domestic and foreign economic policy, however, Iran remained an exporter of raw materials and traditional goods and an importer of both consumer and capital goods in the years before World War II.

Reza Shah Pahlavi, who abdicated in 1941, was succeeded by his son, Mohammad Reza Shah Pahlavi (r. 1941–79). In 1951, Prime Minister Mosaddegh nationalized the Iranian oil industry.  The UK responded with an oil embargo on Iran, and eventually, with the US, backed a successful coup against Prime Minister Mosaddegh in 1953.  After the western removal of the democratically elected government of Iran, between 1954 and 1960 a rapid increase in oil revenues and sustained western foreign aid led to greater investment and fast-paced economic growth, primarily in the government sector. Subsequently, inflation increased, the value of the national currency (the rial) depreciated, and a foreign-trade deficit developed. Economic policies implemented to combat these problems led to declines in the rates of nominal economic growth and per capita income by 1961.

In response to these setbacks, Iran initiated its third economic development plan (1962–68) with an emphasis on industrialization. New economic policies significantly altered the role of the private sector. The expansion of private and public banks, as well as the establishment of two specialized banks, provided reliable credit markets for medium- and large-scale private manufacturing enterprises. Not limited to cheap credit, government programs also included a wide range of incentives to encourage investment in new industries by both Iranian and foreign businesses. Most new investment was a joint effort between either the public sector and foreign investors or private businesses and foreign corporations. Investment in roads, highways, dams, bridges, and seaports also increased. With government support, part of the agricultural sector also attracted significant investment. Many large-scale agricultural operations in meat, dairy products, and fruit production were established. Small-scale farmers, however, did not benefit from the new investment opportunities.

Under the fourth and the fifth economic development plans (1968–73; 1973–78), the Iranian economy became increasingly open to imports and foreign investment. A combination of oil revenues, public spending, and foreign and domestic investments enlarged the middle class in major cities, particularly Tehran. In the wake of the spike in crude oil prices that followed the 1973 war pitting Egypt and Syria against Israel, the process of industrialization and consumption grew rapidly. Between 1973 and 1977, the specialized banks provided more than 200 billion rials to the manufacturing sector, and the increase in investment averaged 56 percent per year. A flood of imported goods and raw materials overwhelmed the capacity of seaports and warehouses. The military was also a beneficiary of the new economic and social conditions. Military personnel, modern artillery and equipment, and military training absorbed a major part of the budget.

Between fiscal year 1964 and FY 1978, Iran's gross national product grew at an annual rate of 13.2 percent at constant prices. The oil, gas, and construction industries expanded by almost 500 percent during this period, while the share of value-added manufacturing increased by 4 percent. Women's participation in the labor force in urban areas increased. Large numbers of urban Iranian women, from varying social strata, joined the semiskilled and skilled labor forces. In addition, the number of women enrolling in higher education increased from 5,000 in FY 1967 to more than 74,000 in FY 1978.

Economic growth, however, became increasingly dependent on oil revenues in the 1970s. By 1977, oil revenues had reached US$20 billion per year (79 percent of total government revenues). Other sectors of the economy and regions of the country did not experience a uniform pattern of growth during this period. Agriculture, traditional and semi-traditional industries, and the services sector did not thrive to the same extent as the “modern” state-sponsored manufacturing industries, which accounted for only 6 percent of industrial employment. As employment opportunities in rural areas and traditional industries decreased, public employment in urban areas increased. The proportion of self-employed Iranians remained stable.

Accelerated development of the middle class was a major outcome of the 1960s and 1970s. Among this class were the new professional intelligentsia, called motekhassesin (experts). Their common denominator was the professional, cultural, or administrative expertise acquired through modern education. Nevertheless, the patterns of economic growth and regional development along with the political underdevelopment of the shah's regime in areas such as civil institutions, human rights, and property rights limited opportunities for the majority of Iranians to develop fully their social and economic potential. Economic and social polarization minimized competition among businesses and limited development to the part of the economy concerned with the interests of dominant groups closely tied to the shah's court and the state. Most Iranians were excluded from political and economic decision making.

After the 1979 revolution

According to the 1979 Iranian Constitution, it is the duty of the Islamic government to furnish all citizens with equal and appropriate opportunities, to provide them with work, and to satisfy their essential needs, so that the course of their progress may be assured. Iran's long-term objectives since the 1979 revolution have been economic independence, full employment, and a comfortable standard of living for citizens, but at the end of the 20th century, the country's economic future faces many obstacles. Iran's population more than doubled in a 20-year period, with an increasingly young population. Although a relatively large part of the population engages in farming, agricultural production has fallen consistently since the 1960s. By the late 1990s, Iran was a major food importer, and economic hardship in the countryside had driven vast numbers of people to migrate to cities.

The rates of literacy and life expectancy in Iran are high for the region, but so is the unemployment rate, and inflation is in the range of 20% annually. Iran remains highly dependent on one major industry, the extraction of petroleum and natural gas for export, and the government faces increasing difficulty in providing opportunities for a younger, better educated workforce. Such lack of opportunities has led to a growing sense of frustration among lower- and middle-class Iranians.

Following the nationalizations in 1979 and the outbreak of the Iran–Iraq War, over 80% of Iran's economy came under the control of the government. After the end of hostilities with Iraq in 1988, the government tried to develop the country's communication, transportation, manufacturing, health care, education and energy infrastructures (including its prospective nuclear power facilities) and has begun the process of integrating its communication and transportation infrastructure with that of neighboring states. It is estimated that Iran sustained a loss of $500 billion through the Iraq war.

In 1996, the U.S. Government passed the Iran and Libya Sanctions Act (ILSA) which prohibits U.S. (and non-U.S. companies) from investing and trading with Iran for more than $20 million annually, with the exception, since 2000, for items like pharmaceuticals, medical equipment.

Overview of Iran's successive economic plans (1991–2010)

Socio-economic development plan (2010–2015)

Historical economic charts

See also

Sasanian economy
Economy of Iran
Privatization in Iran
Iranian Economic Reform Plan
Demography of Iran
Education in Iran
Science and technology in Iran
International rankings of Iran
Trade in Iran's Safavid era

References

Bibliography

External links
Economic History of Iran (Several articles, covering from the pre-Achaemenid period to the modern era) - Encyclopedia Iranica
Iran's Foreign Trade Regime (Many historical data and statistics about Iran's economy) - Ministry of Commerce (Iran)
History of Banking in Iran
Iran's Third Development Plan: an Appraisal by Dr. Jahangir Amuzegar
Where Did Iran's Islamic Economy Come From and Where Did it Go? by Dr. Sohrab Behdad

 
Economy of Iran